John Oscar Rudene (August 1850 – December 30, 1930) was an American politician in the state of Washington. He served in the Washington House of Representatives. Rudene Road in Mount Vernon is named after him.

References

Republican Party members of the Washington House of Representatives
1850 births
1930 deaths